Mueang Lopburi is the capital district (amphoe mueang) of Lopburi province, central Thailand. The district is home to Khok Kathiam Air Force Base.

History

Lopburi is an ancient city. In the Khmer era, it was Lavo or Lava Pura, the important city of the eastern part of the Chao Phraya River valley. In the Ayuthaya kingdom, it was a northeastern frontier city. The glorious period of Lopburi was during the reign of King Narai the Great. He stayed in his palace eight to nine months a year, making Lopburi the second capital of the kingdom. After his reign, the city was nearly deserted, only to be enriched again when King Mongkut visited and renovated King Narai's Palace.

Field Marshal Plaek Phibunsongkhram set up Lopburi as the military center of Thailand. He reformed Lopburi city, with its modern center located about 4 km east from the historical center. His predominant building style, Art Deco shows along Narai Maharat Road.

Geography
The southwestern part of the district is low alluvial plain. The rest is intermixed plains and hills. Besides the Lopburi River, the important water resources are the Sap Lek Reservoir and Khlong Raphiphat. Neighboring districts are (from the west clockwise) Tha Wung, Ban Mi, Khok Samrong and Phatthana Nikhom of Lopburi Province, Phra Phutthabat, Nong Don and Don Phut of Saraburi province, Ban Phraek of Ayutthaya province, and Chaiyo of Ang Thong province.

Administration
The district is divided into 24 sub-districts (tambons), which are further subdivided into 223 villages (mubans). The town (thesaban mueang) Lopburi covers tambon Tha Hin and parts of Thale Chup Son. There are two further sub-district municipalities (thesaban tambon): Khao Phra Ngam covering tambon Khao Phra Ngam, and Khok Tum covering tambons Khok Tum and Nikhom Sang Ton Eng. There are a further 19 tambon administrative organizations (TAO).

Geocode 13 not used.

Transportation 
The district is served by the State Railway of Thailand's Ban Pa Wai, Lopburi, Tha Khae, and Khok Kathiam Railway Stations.

External links
amphoe.com (Thai)

Mueang Lopburi